Ealing, Southall and Middlesex Athletics Club (known as ESMAC, or ESM for short) is an athletics club based in Ealing, West London, England. It is based at the Perivale Park Athletics Track. The club competes at all levels in senior and junior road racing, cross country, and track and field.

History
ESMAC was originally formed in 1966 as an amalgamation of two clubs, Ealing Harriers, and Southall AC. Ealing Harriers was established in 1920, and Southall AC in 1931. On 1 January 1994 the club amalgamated with another local club, Middlesex Ladies Club (Middlesex Ladies was originally formed in 1923).

Over the years, ESMAC has enjoyed great success across all athletics disciplines. Several Olympics, International, National and County honours have been gained by members in Track & Field, Road Racing and Cross Country.

Notable members
ESMAC counts Dame Kelly Holmes as a former member of the club, she still holds the Club's record at 400m, 800m, 1500m, and the mile.

References

External links
 Official website

Sport in the London Borough of Ealing
Athletics clubs in England